Magwa Falls is a waterfall in Eastern Cape province in South Africa. The nearest town is Lusikisiki.

External links
 The Guardian, March 2014. 'The most insane rope-swing bungee jump. Ever' Video of Magwa Falls

Waterfalls of South Africa